Chinese Taipei competed at the 2004 Summer Olympics in Athens, Greece, from 13 to 29 August 2004. "Chinese Taipei" was the designated name used by Taiwan to participate in some international organizations and almost all sporting events, including the Olympic Games.  Neither the common name "Taiwan" nor the official name "Republic of China" would be used primarily due to opposition from the People's Republic of China. This also was the nation's eighth consecutive appearance at the Olympics.

The Chinese Taipei Olympic Committee sent the nation's largest delegation to the Games in Olympic history. A total of 89 athletes, 50 men and 39 women, competed only in 14 different sports. This was also the youngest delegation in Chinese Taipei's Olympic history, with more than half under the age of 25, and many of them were expected to reach their peak in time for the 2008 Summer Olympics in Beijing. Baseball player Chen Chih-yuan was appointed by the committee to carry the Chinese Taipei flag in the opening ceremony.

Chinese Taipei left Athens with a total of five Olympic medals (two golds, two silver, and one bronze), being considered its most successful Olympics. Chinese Taipei's highlight of the Games came with a remarkable milestone for taekwondo jin Chen Shih-hsin and Chu Mu-yen, claiming the nation's first ever gold medals in Olympic history. Meanwhile, another taekwondo jin Huang Chih-hsiung picked up his second medal with a sterling silver in the men's lightweight division, adding it to his bronze from Sydney four years earlier.

Medalists

Archery

Three Chinese Taipei archers qualified each for the men's and women's individual archery, and a spot each for both men's and women's teams.

Men

Women

Athletics

Taiwanese athletes have so far achieved qualifying standards in the following athletics events (up to a maximum of 3 athletes in each event at the 'A' Standard, and 1 at the 'B' Standard).

Men

Women

Badminton

Baseball

Roster
Manager: 85 – Hsu Sheng-ming

Coaches: 29 – Lee Lai-fa, 4 – Lin I-tseng, 80 – Mitsujiro Sakai

Round robin

Cycling

Track
Time trial

Judo

Two Taiwanese judoka qualified for the 2004 Summer Olympics.

Rowing

Taiwanese rowers qualified the following boats:

Men

Women

Qualification Legend: FA=Final A (medal); FB=Final B (non-medal); FC=Final C (non-medal); FD=Final D (non-medal); FE=Final E (non-medal); FF=Final F (non-medal); SA/B=Semifinals A/B; SC/D=Semifinals C/D; SE/F=Semifinals E/F; R=Repechage

Shooting 

Two Taiwanese shooters (one man and one woman) qualified to compete in the following events:

Men

Women

Softball 

Roster

Round robin

Swimming

Taiwanese swimmers earned qualifying standards in the following events (up to a maximum of 2 swimmers in each event at the A-standard time, and 1 at the B-standard time):

Men

Women

Table tennis

Four Taiwanese table tennis players qualified for the following events.

Taekwondo

Four Taiwanese taekwondo jin qualified for the following events.

Tennis

Chinese Taipei nominated a male tennis player to compete in the tournament through a tripartite invitation.

Weightlifting

Seven Taiwanese weightlifters qualified for the following events:

Men

Women

See also
 Chinese Taipei at the 2002 Asian Games
 Chinese Taipei at the 2004 Summer Paralympics

References

External links
Official Report of the XXVIII Olympiad
Chinese Taipei Olympic Committee 

Nations at the 2004 Summer Olympics
2004
Summer Olympics